Malinovsky is a rural locality (a settlement) and the administrative center of Malinovsky Selsoviet of Zavyalovsky District, Altai Krai, Russia. The population was 1266 as of 2016. There are 14 streets.

Geography 
Malinovsky is located 19 km north of Zavyalovo (the district's administrative centre) by road. Krasnodubrovsky is the nearest rural locality.

Ethnicity 
The village is inhabited by Russians and others.

References 

Rural localities in Zavyalovsky District, Altai Krai